The 1834 New Hampshire gubernatorial election was held on March 11, 1834.

Incumbent Democratic Governor Samuel Dinsmoor did not stand for re-election.

Democratic nominee William Badger was elected without formal opposition.

General election

Candidate
William Badger, Democratic, former President of the New Hampshire Senate

Results

Notes

References

1834
New Hampshire
Gubernatorial